Bulliard is a surname. Notable people with the surname include:

 Jean Baptiste François Pierre Bulliard (1742–1793), French physician and botanist
 James Bulliard (born 1978), Canadian actor

See also
 Bullard